In Christianity, salvation (also called deliverance or redemption) is the "saving [of] human beings from sin and its consequences, which include death and separation from God" by Christ's death and resurrection, and the justification following this salvation.

While the idea of Jesus' death as an atonement for human sin was recorded in the Christian Bible, and was elaborated in Paul's epistles and in the Gospels, Paul saw the faithful redeemed by participation in Jesus' death and rising. Early Christians regarded themselves as partaking in a new covenant with God, open to both Jews and Gentiles, through the sacrificial death and subsequent exaltation of Jesus Christ. Early Christian notions of the person and sacrificial role of Jesus in human salvation were further elaborated by the Church Fathers, medieval writers and modern scholars in various atonement theories, such as the ransom theory, Christus Victor theory, recapitulation theory, satisfaction theory, penal substitution theory and moral influence theory.

Variant views on salvation (soteriology) are among the main fault lines dividing the various Christian denominations, including conflicting definitions of sin and depravity (the sinful nature of mankind), justification (God's means of removing the consequences of sin), and atonement (the forgiving or pardoning of sin through the suffering, death and resurrection of Jesus).

Definition and scope

Salvation in Christianity, or deliverance or redemption, is the "saving [of] human beings from death and separation from God" by Christ's death and resurrection.

Christian salvation not only concerns the atonement itself, but also the question of how one partakes of this salvation, by faith, baptism, or obedience; and the question of whether this salvation is individual or universal. It further involves questions regarding the afterlife, e.g. "heaven, hell, purgatory, soul sleep, and annihilation." The fault lines between the various denominations include conflicting definitions of sin, justification, and atonement.

Sin

In the West (differentiating from Eastern Orthodoxy) Christian hamartiology describes sin as an act of offence against God by despising his persons and Christian biblical law, and by injuring others. It is an evil human act, which violates the rational nature of man, as well as God's nature and his eternal law. According to the classical definition of Augustine of Hippo, sin is "a word, deed, or desire in opposition to the eternal law of God".

Christian tradition has explained sin as a fundamental aspect of human existence, brought about by original sin—also called ancestral sin, the fall of man stemming from Adam's rebellion in Eden by eating the forbidden fruit from the tree of knowledge of good and evil. Paul espouses it in Romans 5:12–19, and Augustine of Hippo popularized his interpretation of it in the West, developing it into a notion of "hereditary sin," arguing that God holds all the descendants of Adam and Eve accountable for Adam's sin of rebellion, and as such all people deserve God's wrath and condemnation—apart from any actual sins they personally commit.

Total depravity (also called "radical corruption" or "pervasive depravity") is a Protestant theological doctrine derived from the concept of original sin. It is the teaching that, as a consequence of the fall of man, every person born into the world is enslaved to the service of sin as a result of their inherent fallen nature and, apart from the irresistible or prevenient grace of God, is utterly unable to choose to follow God, refrain from evil, or accept the gift of salvation as it is offered. It is advocated to various degrees by many Protestant confessions of faith and catechisms, including those of some Lutheran synods, and Calvinism, teaching irresistible grace. Arminians, such as Methodists, also believe and teach total depravity, but with the distinct difference of teaching prevenient grace.

Justification

In Christian theology, justification is God's act of removing the guilt and penalty of sin while at the same time making a sinner righteous through Christ's atoning sacrifice. The means of justification is an area of significant difference among Catholicism, Orthodoxy, and Protestantism. Justification is often seen as being the theological fault line that divided Catholic from the Lutheran and Reformed traditions of Protestantism during the Reformation.

Broadly speaking, Eastern Orthodox and Catholic Christians distinguish between initial justification, which in their view ordinarily occurs at baptism; and final salvation, accomplished after a lifetime of striving to do God's will (theosis or divinization).

Theosis is a transformative process whose aim is likeness to or union with God, as taught by the Eastern Orthodox Church and Eastern Catholic Churches. As a process of transformation, theosis is brought about by the effects of catharsis (purification of mind and body) and theoria ('illumination' with the 'vision' of God). According to Eastern Christian teaching, theosis is very much the purpose of human life. It is considered achievable only through a synergy (or cooperation) between human activity and God's uncreated energies (or operations). The synonymous term divinization is the transforming effect of divine grace, the Spirit of God, or the atonement of Christ. Theosis and divinization are distinguished from sanctification, "being made holy," which can also apply to objects; and from apotheosis, also "divinization," ).

Catholics believe faith which is active in charity and good works can justify, or remove the burden of guilt in sin, from man. Forgiveness of sin exists and is natural, but justification can be lost by mortal sin.

In the Protestant doctrine, sin is merely "covered" and righteousness imputed. In Lutheranism and Calvinism, righteousness from God is viewed as being credited to the sinner's account through faith alone, without works. Protestants believe faith without works can justify man because Christ died for sinners, but anyone who truly has faith will produce good works as a product of faith, as a good tree produces good fruit. For Lutherans, justification can be lost with the loss of faith.

Atonement

The English word atonement originally meant "at-one-ment", i.e., being "at one", in harmony, with someone. According to Collins English Dictionary, it is used to describe the saving work that God did through Christ to reconcile the world to himself, and also of the state of a person having been reconciled to God. According to The Oxford Dictionary of the Christian Church, atonement in Christian theology is "man's reconciliation with God through the sacrificial death of Christ."

Many Christians believe that atonement is unlimited; however, some Christians teach that atonement is limited in scope to those who are predestined unto salvation, and its primary benefits are not given to all of mankind but rather to believers only.

Theories of atonement
A number of metaphors and Old Testament terms and references have been used in the New Testament writings to understand the person and death of Jesus. Starting in the 2nd century CE, various understandings of atonement have been explicated to explain the death and resurrection of Jesus, and the metaphors applied by the New Testament to understand his death. Over the centuries, Christians have held different ideas about how Jesus saves people, and different views still exist within different Christian denominations. According to biblical scholar C. Marvin Pate, "there are three aspects to Christ's atonement according to the early Church: vicarious atonement [substitutionary atonement], the eschatological defeat of Satan [Christ the Victor], and the imitation of Christ [participation in Jesus' death and resurrection]." Pate further notes that these three aspects were intertwined in the earliest Christian writings but that this intertwining was lost since the Patristic times. Because of the influence of Gustaf Aulén's 1931  study, the various theories or paradigms of atonement which developed after the New Testament writings are often grouped under the "classic paradigm," the "objective paradigm," and the "subjective paradigm".

Old Testament

In the Hebrew writings, God is absolutely righteous, and only pure and sinless persons can approach him. Reconciliation is achieved by an act of God, namely by his appointment of the sacrificial system, or, in the prophetic view, "by the future Divine gift of a new covenant to replace the old covenant which sinful Israel has broken." The Old Testament describes three types of vicarious atonement which result in purity or sinlessness: the Paschal Lamb; "the sacrificial system as a whole," with the Day of Atonement as the most essential element; and the idea of the suffering servant (Isaiah 42:1–9, 49:1–6, 50:4–11, 52:13–53:12), "the action of a Divinely sent Servant of the Lord who was 'wounded for our transgressions' and 'bear the sin of many'." The Old Testament Apocrypha adds a fourth idea, namely the righteous martyr (2 Maccabees, 4 Maccabees, Wisdom 2–5).

In addition,  have no expiating effect unless the person making the offering sincerely repents of their actions before making the offering, and makes restitution to any person who was harmed by the violation. Marcus Borg notes that animal sacrifice in Second Temple Judaism was not a "payment for sin," but had a basic meaning as "making something sacred by giving it as a gift to God," and included a shared meal with God. Sacrifices had numerous purposes, namely thanksgiving, petition, purification, and reconciliation. None of them was a "payment or substitution or satisfaction," and even "sacrifices of reconciliation were about restoring the relationship." James F. McGrath refers to 4 Maccabees 6, "which presents a martyr praying 'Be merciful to your people, and let our punishment suffice for them. Make my blood their purification, and take my life in exchange for theirs' (4 Maccabees 6:28–29). Clearly there were ideas that existed in the Judaism of the time that helped make sense of the death of the righteous in terms of atonement."

New Testament

Jerusalem 

In the Jerusalem , from which Paul received this creed, the phrase "died for our sins" probably was an apologetic rationale for the death of Jesus as being part of God's plan and purpose, as evidenced in the scriptures. The phrase "died for our sins" was derived from Isaiah, especially Isaiah 53:1–11, and 4 Maccabees, especially 4 Maccabees 6:28–29. "Raised on the third day" is derived from Hosea 6:1–2: 

Soon after his death, Jesus' followers believed he was raised from death by God and exalted to divine status as Lord "at God's 'right hand'," which "associates him in astonishing ways with God." According to Hurtado, powerful religious experiences were an indispensable factor in the emergence of this Christ-devotion. Those experiences "seem to have included visions of (and/or ascents to) God's heaven, in which the glorified Christ was seen in an exalted position." Those experiences were interpreted in the framework of God's redemptive purposes, as reflected in the scriptures, in a "dynamic interaction between devout, prayerful searching for, and pondering over, scriptural texts and continuing powerful religious experiences." This initiated a "new devotional pattern unprecedented in Jewish monotheism," that is, the worship of Jesus next to God, giving a central place to Jesus because his ministry, and its consequences, had a strong impact on his early followers. Revelations, including those visions, but also inspired and spontaneous utterances, and "charismatic exegesis" of the Jewish scriptures, convinced them that this devotion was commanded by God.

Paul

For Paul, "dying for our sins" gained a deeper significance, providing "a basis for the salvation of sinful Gentiles apart from the Torah."

Traditionally, this  is interpreted as meaning that Jesus' death was an "atonement" for sin, or a ransom, or a means of propitiating God or expiating God's wrath against humanity because of their sins. With Jesus' death, humanity was freed from this wrath. In the classical Protestant understanding humans partake in this salvation by faith in Jesus Christ; this faith is a grace given by God, and people are justified by God through Jesus Christ and faith in him.

More recent scholarship has raised several concerns regarding these interpretations. The traditional interpretation sees Paul's understanding of salvation as involving "an exposition of the individual's relation to God." According to Krister Stendahl, the main concern of Paul's writings on Jesus' role, and salvation by faith, is not the individual conscience of human sinners, and their doubts about being chosen by God or not, but the problem of the inclusion of Gentile (Greek) Torah observers into God's covenant. Paul draws on several interpretative frames to solve this problem, but most importantly, his own experience and understanding. The  from 1 Cor.15:3-5 refers to two mythologies: the Greek myth of the noble dead, to which the Maccabean notion of martyrdom and dying for ones people is related; and the Jewish myth of the persecuted sage or righteous man, in particular the "story of the child of wisdom." For Paul, the notion of 'dying for' refers to this martyrdom and persecution. According to Burton Mack, 'Dying for our sins' refers to the problem of Gentile Torah-observers, who, despite their faithfulness, cannot fully observe commandments, including circumcision, and are therefore 'sinners', excluded from God's covenant.  Jesus' death and resurrection solved this problem of the exclusion of the Gentiles from God's covenant, as indicated by Romans 3:21–26.

According to E.P. Sanders, who initiated the New Perspective on Paul, Paul saw the faithful redeemed by participation in Jesus' death and rising. But "Jesus' death substituted for that of others and thereby freed believers from sin and guilt," a metaphor derived from "ancient sacrificial theology," the essence of Paul's writing is not in the "legal terms" regarding the expiation of sin, but the act of "participation in Christ through dying and rising with him." According to Sanders, "those who are baptized into Christ are baptized into his death, and thus they escape the power of sin [...] he died so that the believers may die with him and consequently live with him." James F. McGrath notes that Paul "prefers to use the language of participation. One died for all, so that all died (2 Corinthians 5:14). This is not only different from substitution, it is the opposite of it." By this participation in Christ's death and rising, "one receives forgiveness for past offences, is liberated from the powers of sin, and receives the Spirit." Paul insists that salvation is received by the grace of God; according to Sanders, this insistence is in line with Judaism of  until 200 CE, which saw God's covenant with Israel as an act of grace of God. Observance of the Law is needed to maintain the covenant, but the covenant is not earned by observing the Law, but by the grace of God.

Several passages from Paul, such as Romans 3:25, are traditionally interpreted as meaning that humanity is saved by faith  Christ. According to Richard B. Hays, who initiated the "Pistis Christou debate," a different reading of these passages is also possible. The phrase  can be translated as 'faith in Christ', that is, salvation by believing in Christ, the traditional interpretation; or as 'faithfulness of Christ', that is, belief "through the faithfulness of Jesus Christ." In this view, according to Cobb, Jesus' life and death was not seen by Paul as an atonement, but as a means to participate in faithfulness. In this interpretation, Romans 3:21–26 states that Jesus was faithful, even to the cost of death, and justified by God for this faithfulness. Those who participate in this faithfulness are equally justified by God, both Jews and Gentiles. While this view has found support by a range of scholars, it has also been questioned and criticized.

Gospels

In the Gospels, Jesus is portrayed as calling for repentance from sin, and saying that God wants mercy rather than sacrifices (Matthew 9:13). Yet, he is also portrayed as "giving His life [as] a ransom for many" and applying the "suffering servant" passage of Isaiah 53 to himself (Luke 22:37). The Gospel of John portrays him as the sacrificial Lamb of God, and compares his death to the sacrifice of the Passover Lamb at Pesach.

Christians assert that Jesus was predicted by Isaiah, as attested in Luke 4:16–22, where Jesus is portrayed as saying that the prophecies in Isaiah were about him. The New Testament explicitly quotes from Isaiah 53 in Matthew 8:16–18 to indicate that Jesus is the fulfillment of these prophecies.

Classic paradigm

The classic paradigm entails the traditional understandings of the early Church Fathers, who developed the themes found in the New Testament.

Ransom from Satan

The ransom theory of atonement says that Christ liberated humanity from slavery to sin and Satan, and thus death, by giving his own life as a ransom sacrifice to Satan, swapping the life of the perfect (Jesus), for the lives of the imperfect (other humans). It entails the idea that God deceived the devil, and that Satan, or death, had "legitimate rights" over sinful souls in the afterlife, due to the fall of man and inherited sin. During the first millennium CE, the ransom theory of atonement was the dominant metaphor for atonement, both in eastern and western Christianity, until it was replaced in the west by Anselm's satisfaction theory of atonement.

In one version of the idea of deception, Satan attempted to take Jesus' soul after he had died, but in doing so over-extended his authority, as Jesus had never sinned. As a consequence, Satan lost his authority completely, and all humanity gained freedom. In another version, God entered into a deal with Satan, offering to trade Jesus' soul in exchange for the souls of all people, but after the trade, God raised Jesus from the dead and left Satan with nothing. Other versions held that Jesus' divinity was masked by his human form, so Satan tried to take Jesus' soul without realizing that his divinity would destroy Satan's power. Another idea is that Jesus came to teach how not to sin and Satan, in anger with this, tried to take his soul.

The ransom theory was first clearly enunciated by Irenaeus, who was an outspoken critic of Gnosticism, but borrowed ideas from their dualistic worldview. In this worldview, mankind is under the power of the Demiurge, a lesser god who created the world. Yet, humans have a spark of the true divine nature within them, which can be liberated by gnosis (knowledge) of this divine spark. This knowledge is revealed by the Logos, "the very mind of the supreme God," who entered the world in the person of Jesus. Nevertheless, the Logos could not simply undo the power of the Demiurge, and had to hide his real identity, appearing in a physical form, thereby misleading the Demiurge, and liberating mankind. In Irenaeus' writings, the Demiurge is replaced by the devil.

Origen (184–253) introduced the idea that the devil held legitimate rights over humans, who were bought free by the blood of Christ. He also introduced the notion that the Devil was deceived in thinking that he could master the human soul.

Gustaf Aulén reinterpreted the ransom theory in his study  (1931), calling it the Christus Victor doctrine, arguing that Christ's death was not a payment to the Devil, but defeated the powers of evil, particularly Satan, which had held mankind in their dominion. According to Pugh, "Ever since [Aulén's] time, we call these patristic ideas the  way of seeing the cross."

Recapitulation theory

The recapitulation view, first comprehensively expressed by Irenaeus, went "hand-in-hand" with the ransom theory. It says that Christ succeeds where Adam failed, undoing the wrong that Adam did and, because of his union with humanity, leads humanity on to eternal life, including moral perfection. Theosis ("divinisation") is a "corollary" of the recapitulation.

Objective paradigm

Satisfaction

In the 11th century, Anselm of Canterbury rejected the ransom view and proposed the satisfaction theory of atonement. He allegedly depicted God as a feudal lord whose honor had been offended by the sins of mankind. In this view, people needed salvation from the divine punishment that these offences would bring, since nothing they could do could repay the honor debt. Anselm held that Christ had infinitely honored God through his life and death and that Christ could repay what humanity owed God, thus satisfying the offence to God's honor and doing away with the need for punishment. When Anselm proposed the satisfaction view, it was immediately criticized by Peter Abelard.

Penal substitution

In the 16th century, the Protestant Reformers reinterpreted Anselm's satisfaction theory of salvation within a legal paradigm. In the legal system, offences required punishment, and no satisfaction could be given to avert this need. They proposed a theory known as penal substitution, in which Christ takes the penalty of people's sin as their substitute, thus saving people from God's wrath against sin. Penal substitution thus presents Jesus saving people from the divine punishment of their past wrongdoings. However, this salvation is not presented as automatic. Rather, a person must have faith in order to receive this free gift of salvation. In the penal substitution view, salvation is not dependent upon human effort or deeds.

The penal substitution paradigm of salvation is widely held among Protestants, who often consider it central to Christianity. However, it has also been widely critiqued, and is rejected by liberal Christians as un-Biblical, and an offense to the love of God. According to Richard Rohr, "[t]hese theories are based on retributive justice rather than the restorative justice that the prophets and Jesus taught." Advocates of the New Perspective on Paul also argue that many New Testament epistles of Paul the Apostle, which used to support the theory of penal substitution, should be interpreted differently.

Governmental theory

The "governmental theory of atonement" teaches that Christ suffered for humanity so that God could forgive humans without punishing them while still maintaining divine justice. It is traditionally taught in Arminian circles that draw primarily from the works of Hugo Grotius.

Subjective paradigm

Moral transformation

The "moral influence theory of atonement" was developed, or most notably propagated, by Abelard (1079–1142), as an alternative to Anselm's satisfaction theory. Abelard not only "rejected the idea of Jesus' death as a ransom paid to the devil", which turned the Devil into a rival god, but also objected to the idea that Jesus' death was a "debt paid to God's honor". He also objected to the emphasis on God's judgment, and the idea that God changed his mind after the sinner accepted Jesus' sacrificial death, which was not easily reconcilable with the idea of "the perfect, impassible God [who] does not change". Abelard focused on changing man's perception of God – not to be seen as offended, harsh, and judgemental, but as loving. According to Abelard, "Jesus died as the demonstration of God's love", a demonstration which can change the hearts and minds of the sinners, turning back to God.

During the Protestant Reformation in Western Christianity, the majority of the Reformers strongly rejected the moral influence view of the atonement in favor of penal substitution, a highly forensic modification of the honor-oriented Anselmian satisfaction model. Fausto Sozzini's Socinian arm of the Reformation maintained a belief in the moral influence view of the atonement. Socinianism was an early form of Unitarianism, and the Unitarian Church today maintains a moral influence view of the atonement, as do many liberal Protestant theologians of the modern age.

During the 18th century, versions of the moral influence view found overwhelming support among German theologians, most notably the Enlightenment philosopher Immanuel Kant. In the 19th and 20th century, it has been popular among liberal Protestant thinkers in the Anglican, Methodist, Lutheran, and Presbyterian churches, including the Anglican theologian Hastings Rashdall. A number of English theological works in the last hundred years have advocated and popularized the moral influence theory of atonement.

A strong division has remained since the Reformation between liberal Protestants (who typically adopt a moral influence view) and conservative Protestants (who typically adopt a penal substitutionary view). Both sides believe that their position is taught by the Bible.

Moral example theory

A related theory, the "moral example theory", was developed by Faustus Socinus (1539–1604) in his work  (1578). He rejected the idea of "vicarious satisfaction". According to Socinus, Jesus' death offers us a perfect example of self-sacrificial dedication to God."

A number of theologians see "example" (or "exemplar") theories of the atonement as variations of the moral influence theory. Wayne Grudem, however, argues that "Whereas the moral influence theory says that Christ's death teaches us how much God loves us, the example theory says that Christ's death teaches us how we should live." Grudem identifies the Socinians as supporters of the example theory.

Other theories

Embracement theory

Hong Kong Baptist University Department of Religion and Philosophy lecturer Domenic Marbaniang, drawing on Friedrich Nietzsche, sees the Divine voluntary self-giving as the ultimate embracement of humanity in its ultimate act of sin, viz, deicide, or the murder of God, thus canceling sin on the cross.

Shared atonement theory
Southern Baptist theologian David Jeremiah writes that in the "shared atonement" theory the atonement is spoken of as shared by all. To wit, God sustains the Universe. Therefore, if Jesus was God in human form, when he died, the entirety of humanity died with him, and when he rose from the dead, the entirety of humanity rose with him.

Compatibility of differing theories
Some theologians maintain that "various biblical understandings of the atonement need not conflict". Reformed theologian J. I. Packer, for example, although he maintains that "penal substitution is the mainstream, historic view of the church and the essential meaning of the Atonement... Yet with penal substitution at the center", he also maintains that " and other Scriptural views of atonement can work together to present a fully orbed picture of Christ's work". J. Kenneth Grider, speaking from a governmental theory perspective, says that the governmental theory can incorporate within itself "numerous understandings promoted in the other major Atonement theories", including ransom theory, elements of the "Abelardian 'moral influence' theory", vicarious aspects of the atonement, etc.

Anglican theologian Oliver Chase Quick described differing theories as being of value, but also denied that any particular theory was fully true, saying, "if we start from the fundamental and cardinal thought of God's act of love in Jesus Christ [...] I think we can reach a reconciling point of view, from which each type of theory is seen to make its essential contribution to the truth, although no one theory, no any number of theories, can be sufficient to express its fullness."

Others say that some models of the atonement naturally exclude each other. James F. McGrath, for example, talking about the atonement, says that "Paul [...] prefers to use the language of participation. One died for all, so that all died (2 Corinthians 5:14). This is not only different from substitution, it is the opposite of it." Similarly, Mark M. Mattison, in his article The Meaning of the Atonement says, "Substitution implies an "either/or"; participation implies a "both/and."" J. Kenneth Grider, quoted above showing the compatibility of various atonement models with the governmental theory, nevertheless also says that both penal substitution and satisfaction atonement theories are incompatible with the governmental theory.

Confusion of terms
Some confusion can occur when discussing the atonement because the terms used sometimes have differing meanings depending on the contexts in which they are used. For example:
 Sometimes substitutionary atonement is used to refer to penal substitution alone, when the term also has a broader sense including other atonement models that are not penal.
 Penal substitution is also sometimes described as a type of satisfaction atonement, but the term 'satisfaction atonement' functions primarily as a technical term to refer particularly to Anselm's theory.
 Substitutionary and penal themes are found within the Patristic (and later) literature, but they are not used in a penal substitutionary sense until the Reformed period.
 'Substitution', as well as potentially referring to specific theories of the atonement (e.g. penal substitution), is also sometimes used in a less technical way—for example, when used in 'the sense that [Jesus, through his death,] did for us that which we can never do for ourselves'.
 The phrase 'vicarious atonement' is sometimes used as a synonym for penal substitution, and is also sometimes used to describe other, non-penal substitutionary, theories of atonement. Care needs to be taken to understand what is being referred to by the various terms used in different contexts.

Eastern Christianity

According to Eastern Christian theology, based upon their understanding of the atonement as put forward by Irenaeus recapitulation theory, Jesus' death is a ransom. This restores the relation with God, who is loving and reaches out to humanity, and offers the possibility of theosis or divinization, becoming the kind of humans God wants us to be.

In Eastern Orthodoxy and Eastern Catholicism salvation is seen as participation in the renewal of human nature itself by way of the eternal Word of God assuming the human nature in its fullness. In contrast to Western branches of theology, Eastern Orthodox Christians tend to use the word "expiation" with regard to what is accomplished in the sacrificial act. In Orthodox theology, expiation is an act of offering that seeks to change the one making the offering. The Biblical Greek word which is translated both as "propitiation" and as "expiation" is hilasmos (I John 2:2, 4:10), which means "to make acceptable and enable one to draw close to God". Thus the Orthodox emphasis would be that Christ died, not to appease an angry and vindictive Father or to avert the wrath of God upon sinners, but to defeat and secure the destruction of sin and death, so that those who are fallen and in spiritual bondage may become divinely transfigured, and therefore fully human, as their Creator intended; that is to say, human creatures become God in his energies or operations but not in his essence or identity, conforming to the image of Christ and reacquiring the divine likeness (see theosis).

The Orthodox Church further teaches that a person abides in Christ and makes his salvation sure not only by works of love, but also by his patient suffering of various griefs, illnesses, misfortunes and failures.

Catholicism

The Catholic Church teaches that the death of Jesus on the Cross is a sacrifice that redeems man and reconciles man to God. The sacrifice of Jesus is both a "gift from God the Father himself, for the Father handed his Son over to sinners in order to reconcile us with himself" and "the offering of the Son of God made man, who in freedom and love offered his life to his Father through the Holy Spirit in reparation for our disobedience."

The Catholic view of Christ's redemptive work was set forth formally at the Sixth Session of the Council of Trent. The council stated that Jesus merited the grace of justification, which is not only the remission of sin but the infusion of the virtues of faith, hope and charity into the Christian. A justified Christian is then said to be in the state of grace, which can be lost by committing a mortal sin. The view that prevailed at the Council of Trent has been described as a "combination of the opinions of Anselm and Abelard." Catholic scholars have noted that Abelard did not teach that Jesus was merely a good moral example, but that Christians are truly saved by His sacrifice on the Cross. The moral transformation of the Christian is not the result of merely following Christ's example and teachings, but a supernatural gift merited by the sacrifice of Jesus, for "by one man's obedience many will be made righteous."

While the initial grace of justification is merited solely by the sacrifice of Jesus, the Catholic Church teaches that a justified Christian can merit an increase in justification and the attainment of eternal life by cooperating with God's grace. The grace of final perseverance preserves a justified Christian in the state of grace until his or her death.

The practical manner of salvation is expounded on by St. Alphonsus Liguori, a Doctor of the Church:

The Catholic Church shares the Eastern Christian belief in divinization, teaching that "the Son of God became man so that we might become God." However, in contrast with the Eastern Orthodox notion of theosis in which the divinized Christian becomes God in his energies or operations, the Catholic Church teaches that the ultimate end of divinization is the beatific vision, in which the divinized Christian will see God's essence.

Protestantism

In Protestantism, grace is the result of God's initiative without any regard whatsoever to the one initiating the works, and no one can merit the grace of God by performing rituals, good works, asceticism, or meditation. Broadly speaking, Protestants hold to the five solae of the Reformation, which declare that salvation is attained by grace alone in Christ alone through faith alone for the Glory of God alone as told in Scripture alone. Most Protestants believe that salvation is achieved through God's grace alone, and once salvation is secured in the person, good works will be a result of this, allowing good works to often operate as a signifier for salvation. Some Protestants, such as Lutherans and the Reformed, understand this to mean that God saves solely by grace, and that works follow as a necessary consequence of saving grace. Others, such as Methodists (and other Arminians), believe that salvation is by faith alone, but that salvation can be forfeited if it is not accompanied by continued faith, and the works that naturally follow from it. A minority rigidly believe that salvation is accomplished by faith alone without any reference to works whatsoever, including the works that may follow salvation (see Free Grace theology).

Lutheranism
Lutherans believe that Christ, through His death and resurrection, has obtained justification and atonement for all sinners. Lutheran churches believe that this is the central message in the Bible upon which the very existence of the churches depends. In Lutheranism, it is a message relevant to people of all races and social levels, of all times and places, for "the result of one trespass was condemnation for all men" (Romans 5:18). All need forgiveness of sins before God, and Scripture proclaims that all have been justified, for "the result of one act of righteousness was justification that brings life for all men" (Romans 5:18).

Lutheranism teaches that individuals receive this free gift of forgiveness and salvation not on the basis of their own works, but only through faith (Sola fide):

Saving faith is the knowledge of, acceptance of, and trust in the promise of the Gospel. Even faith itself is seen as a gift of God, created in the hearts of Christians by the work of the Holy Spirit through the Word and Baptism. Faith is seen as an instrument that receives the gift of salvation, not something that causes salvation. Thus, Lutherans reject the "decision theology" which is common among modern evangelicals.

Calvinism
Calvinists believe in the predestination of the elect before the foundation of the world. All of the elect necessarily persevere in faith because God keeps them from falling away. Calvinists understand the doctrines of salvation to include the five points of Calvinism, typically arranged in English to form the acrostic "TULIP".

 "Total depravity", also called "total inability", asserts that as a consequence of the fall of man into sin, every person born into the world is enslaved to the service of sin. People are not by nature inclined to love God with their whole heart, mind, or strength, but rather all are inclined to serve their own interests over those of their neighbor and to reject the rule of God. Thus, all people by their own faculties are morally unable to choose to follow God and be saved because they are unwilling to do so out of the necessity of their own natures. (The term "total" in this context refers to sin affecting every part of a person, not that every person is as evil as possible.) This doctrine is derived from Augustine's explanation of Original Sin.
 "Unconditional election" asserts that God has chosen from eternity those whom he will bring to himself not based on foreseen virtue, merit, or faith in those people; rather, it is unconditionally grounded in God's mercy alone. God has chosen from eternity to extend mercy to those he has chosen and to withhold mercy from those not chosen. Those chosen receive salvation through Christ alone. Those not chosen receive the just wrath that is warranted for their sins against God
 "Limited atonement", also called "particular redemption" or "definite atonement", asserts that Jesus's substitutionary atonement was definite and certain in its purpose and in what it accomplished. This implies that only the sins of the elect were atoned for by Jesus's death. Calvinists do not believe, however, that the atonement is limited in its value or power, but rather that the atonement is limited in the sense that it is designed for some and not all. Hence, Calvinists hold that the atonement is sufficient for all and efficient for the elect. The doctrine is driven by the Calvinistic concept of the sovereignty of God in salvation and their understanding of the nature of the atonement.
 "Irresistible grace", also called "efficacious grace", asserts that the saving grace of God is effectually applied to those whom he has determined to save (that is, the elect) and, in God's timing, overcomes their resistance to obeying the call of the gospel, bringing them to a saving faith. This means that when God sovereignly purposes to save someone, that individual certainly will be saved. The doctrine holds that this purposeful influence of God's Holy Spirit cannot be resisted, but that the Holy Spirit, "graciously causes the elect sinner to cooperate, to believe, to repent, to come freely and willingly to Christ."
 "Perseverance of the saints", or "preservation of the saints", asserts that since God is sovereign and his will cannot be frustrated by humans or anything else, those whom God has called into communion with himself will continue in faith until the end. Those who apparently fall away either never had true faith to begin with or will return. The word "saints" is used to refer to all who are set apart by God, and not only those who are exceptionally holy, canonized, or in heaven).

Arminianism
Arminian soteriology—held by Christian denominations such as the Methodist Church—is based on the theological ideas of the Dutch Reformed theologian Jacobus Arminius (1560–1609). Like Calvinists, Arminians agree that all people are born sinful and are in need of salvation. Classical Arminians emphasize that God's free grace (or prevenient grace) enables humans to freely respond to or to reject the salvation offered through Christ. Classical Arminians believe that a person's saving relationship with Christ is conditional upon faith, and thus, a person can sever his or her saving relationship with Christ through persistent unbelief. The relationship of "the believer to Christ is never a static relationship existing as the irrevocable consequence of a past decision, act, or experience."

The Five Articles of Remonstrance that Arminius's followers formulated in 1610 state the beliefs regarding (I) conditional election, (II) unlimited atonement, (III) total depravity, (IV) total depravity and resistible grace, and (V) possibility of apostasy. However, the fifth article did not completely deny the perseverance of the saints; Arminius said that "I never taught that a true believer can… fall away from the faith… yet I will not conceal, that there are passages of Scripture which seem to me to wear this aspect; and those answers to them which I have been permitted to see, are not of such a kind as to approve themselves on all points to my understanding." Further, the text of the Articles of Remonstrance says that no believer can be plucked from Christ's hand, and the matter of falling away, "loss of salvation", required further study before it could be taught with any certainty.

Methodism

Methodism falls squarely in the tradition of substitutionary atonement, though it is linked with Christus Victor and moral influence theories. Methodism also emphasizes a participatory nature in atonement, in which the Methodist believer spiritually dies with Christ as He dies for humanity.

Methodism affirms the doctrine of justification by faith, but in Wesleyan theology, justification refers to "pardon, the forgiveness of sins", rather than "being made actually just and righteous", which Methodists believe is accomplished through sanctification. John Wesley, the founder of the Methodist Churches, taught that the keeping of the moral law contained in the Ten Commandments, as well as engaging in the works of piety and the works of mercy, were "indispensable for our sanctification".

Methodist soteriology emphasizes the importance of the pursuit of holiness in salvation, a concept best summarized in a quote by Methodist evangelist Phoebe Palmer who stated that "justification would have ended with me had I refused to be holy." Thus, for Methodists, "true faith...cannot subsist without works".

While "faith is essential for a meaningful relationship with God, our relationship with God also takes shape through our care for people, the community, and creation itself." Methodism, inclusive of the holiness movement, thus teaches that "justification [is made] conditional on obedience and progress in sanctification", emphasizing "a deep reliance upon Christ not only in coming to faith, but in remaining in the faith."

Anabaptism
Anabaptist denominations such as the Mennonites teach:

Obedience to Jesus and a careful keeping of the Ten Commandments, in addition to loving one another and being at peace with others, are seen as "earmarks of the saved".

Universalism

Christian universalism is the doctrine or belief that all people will ultimately be reconciled to God. The appeal of the idea of universal salvation may be related to the perception of a problem of Hell, standing opposed to ideas such as endless conscious torment in Hell, but may also include a period of finite punishment similar to a state of purgatory. Believers in universal reconciliation may support the view that while there may be a real "Hell" of some kind, it is neither a place of endless suffering nor a place where the spirits of human beings are ultimately 'annihilated' after enduring the just amount of divine retribution.

Restorationism

Churches of Christ

Churches of Christ are strongly anti-Calvinist in their understanding of salvation, and generally present conversion as "obedience to the proclaimed facts of the gospel rather than as the result of an emotional, Spirit-initiated conversion." Some churches of Christ hold the view that humans of accountable age are lost because of their sins. These lost souls can be redeemed because Jesus Christ, the Son of God, offered himself as the atoning sacrifice. Children too young to understand right from wrong, and make a conscious choice between the two, are believed to be innocent of sin. The age when this occurs is generally believed to be around 13.

Beginning in the 1960s, many preachers began placing more emphasis on the role of grace in salvation, instead of focusing exclusively implementing all of the New Testament commands and examples.

The Churches of Christ argue that since faith and repentance are necessary, and that the cleansing of sins is by the blood of Christ through the grace of God, baptism is not an inherently redeeming ritual. One author describes the relationship between faith and baptism this way, "Faith is the reason why a person is a child of God; baptism is the time at which one is incorporated into Christ and so becomes a child of God" (italics are in the source). Baptism is understood as a confessional expression of faith and repentance, rather than a "work" that earns salvation.

Other

The New Church (Swedenborgian)
According to the doctrine of The New Church, as explained by Emanuel Swedenborg (1688–1772), there is no such thing as substitutionary atonement as is generally understood. Swedenborg's account of atonement has much in common with the Christus Victor doctrine, which refers to a Christian understanding of the Atonement which views Christ's death as the means by which the powers of evil, which held humanity under their dominion, were defeated. It is a model of the atonement that is dated to the Church Fathers, and it, along with the related ransom theory, was the dominant theory of the atonement for a thousand years.

Jehovah's Witnesses

According to Jehovah's Witnesses, atonement for sins comes only through the life, ministry, and death of Jesus Christ. They believe Jesus was the "second Adam", being the pre-existent and sinless Son of God who became the human Messiah of Israel, and that he came to undo Adamic sin.

Witnesses believe that the sentence of death given to Adam and subsequently his offspring by God required an equal substitute or ransom sacrifice of a perfect man. They believe that salvation is possible only through Jesus' ransom sacrifice, and that individuals cannot be reconciled to God until they repent of their sins, and then call on the name of God through Jesus. Salvation is described as a free gift from God, but is said to be unattainable without obedience to Christ as King and good works, such as baptism, confession of sins, evangelizing, and promoting God's Kingdom, that are prompted by faith. According to their teaching, the works prove faith is genuine. "Preaching the good news" is said to be one of the works necessary for salvation, both of those who preach and those to whom they preach. They believe that people in the "last days" can be "saved" by identifying Jehovah's Witnesses as God's theocratic organization, and by serving God as a part of it.

The Church of Jesus Christ of Latter-day Saints

The Church of Jesus Christ of Latter-day Saints teaches that the atonement of Jesus Christ is infinite and the central principle that enables the "plan of redemption" which is often also called the "plan of salvation". In the Book of Mormon the prophet Amulek teaches that the "great and last sacrifice will be the Son of God, yea, infinite and eternal. And thus he shall bring salvation to all those who shall believe on his name" There are two parts of salvation, conditional and unconditional. Unconditional salvation means that the atonement of Jesus Christ redeems all humanity from the chains of death and they are resurrected to their perfect frames. Conditional salvation of the righteous comes by grace coupled with strict obedience to Gospel principles, in which those who have upheld the highest standards and are committed to the covenants and ordinances of God, will inherit the highest heaven. There is no need for infant baptism. Christ's atonement completely resolved the consequence from the fall of Adam of spiritual death for infants, young children and those of innocent mental capacity who die before an age of self-accountability, hence all these are resurrected to eternal life in the resurrection. However, baptism is required of those who are deemed by God to be accountable for their actions (Moroni 8:10–22)

The United Pentecostal Church
Oneness Pentecostals teach that the death, burial, and resurrection of Jesus Christ are the only means by which atonement can be obtained for dying humanity, and which makes the free gift of God's salvation possible. They believe that all must put faith in the propitiatory work of Christ to gain everlasting life. According to United Pentecostal theology, this saving faith is more than just mental assent or intellectual acceptance, or even verbal profession, but must include trust, appropriation, application, action, and obedience. They contend that water baptism is one of the works of faith and obedience necessary for Christ's sacrificial atonement to be efficacious.

See also

 Absolution
 Christology
 Ecclesiology
 Eternal life (Christianity)

References

Notes

Citations

Sources
Printed sources

 

 

 

  

 

 

 
 
 

 

 

 

 
 

 
 

 
 

 
 

 
 

 

 

 

 

 
 

 

(

 

 

 
 

 

 

Web-sources

Further reading

 Janowski, Bernd. "Atonement." In The Encyclopedia of Christianity, edited by Erwin Fahlbusch and Geoffrey William Bromiley, 152–154. Vol. 1. Grand Rapids: Wm. B. Eerdmans, 1999. 
 Thomas, G. Michael. The Extent of the Atonement: a Dilemma for Reformed Theology, from Calvin to the Consensus, in series, Paternoster Biblical and Theological Monographs (Carlisle, Scotland: Paternoster Publishing, 1997)

External links 

 Philosophy and Christian Theology > Atonement from Stanford Encyclopedia of Philosophy
"Atonement" in the Jewish Encyclopedia

 
Salvation
 
Christian hamartiology